It's Not Just You, Murray! (1964) is a short film directed by Martin Scorsese. The film focuses on Murray, a middle-aged mobster who looks back at his beginnings. The film premiered at the New York Film Festival in 1966. It's Not Just You, Murray! won various awards including the Producers Guild Award for Best Student Film, and Jesse L Lasky Intercollegiate Award.

Plot 
Murray (played by Ira Rubin), is a middle-aged mobster, looks back at his beginnings from being a bootlegger to becoming wealthy and highly influential. He claims his success and happiness is from the support of his "friend" Joe (played by Sam De Fazio). Murray follows Joe blindly but Joe backstabs him by sleeping with his wife.

Cast 
Credits adapted from British Film Institute.

 Ira Rubin as Murray
 Sam De Fazio as Joe
 Andrea Martin as Murray's wife
 Catherine Scorsese as mother

Production 
The film was made at New York University. The film is 15 minutes long, shot in 16 mm film as black and white film. While working on the film, Martin Scorsese met Laraine Marie Brennan, whom he married. Much of the film was shot in Scorsese's apartment. The story of the film is based on his uncle. Scorsese co-wrote the script with Mardik Martin. The film marked the debut for Scorsese's mother Catherine Scorsese. It later premiered at the New York Film Festival in 1966.

Reception 
In 1964, It's Not Just You, Murray! won the Producers Guild Award for Best Student Film. Later, the film won the Jesse L Lasky Intercollegiate Award.

Patricia Cooper and Ken Dancyger wrote that the film is "among the best student films ever made". Mark Asch of Reverse Shot wrote, "The celebration of one’s influences—a constant in Scorsese's career—is a characteristic It’s Not Just You, Murray! shares with innumerable other student films". Christopher Campbell of Business Insider wrote that the film "features a few more parallels and even seems like a template for a number of later works, including Goodfellas, Casino and now The Wolf of Wall Street." Nora Sayre of The New York Times wrote, "What's pleasing throughout is the way that the narration contradicts what's taking place on the screen".

References

External links

1964 films
1964 short films
1960s English-language films
American black-and-white films
American short films
Short films directed by Martin Scorsese